This is a list of regions of Mongolia by Human Development Index as of 2023 with data for the year 2021.

References 

Mongolia
Human Development Index
Regions of Mongolia by Human Development Index